Trail mix or scroggin is a type of snack mix, typically a combination of granola, dried fruit, nuts, and sometimes candy, developed as a food to be taken along on hikes. Trail mix is considered a great snack food for hikes, because it is lightweight, easy to store, and nutritious, providing a quick energy boost from the carbohydrates in the dried fruit or granola, and sustained energy from fat in nuts.

The combination of nuts, raisins and chocolate as a trail snack dates at least to the 1910s, when outdoorsman Horace Kephart recommended it in his popular camping guide.

Other names
In New Zealand, trail mix is known as "scroggin" or "schmogle". In Australia, the term "scroggin" is used exclusively, although in more recent years, "trail mix" has been imported into the jargon from the USA. Some claim that the name stands for sultanas, carob, raisins, orange peel, grains, glucose, and nuts or alternatively sultanas, chocolate, raisins and other goody-goodies including nuts; but this may be a backronym.

The American word gorp, a term for trail mix often used by hikers in North America, is typically said to be an acronym for "good ol' raisins and peanuts", although the mix may contain M&M's and other nuts. The Oxford English Dictionary cites a 1913 reference to the verb gorp, meaning "to eat greedily", so the "good ol' raisins and peanuts" explanation may be folk etymology or a backronym.

In Germany, Poland, Hungary, the Netherlands, Scandinavia, and several other European countries, trail mix is called "student fodder", "student oats", or "student mix" in the local languages and usually does not include chocolate. In Iran, mixed nuts are called "ajil", eaten at festivals like Yaldā Night or just a social "mehmooni".

Ingredients
Common ingredients may include:

 Nuts, such as almonds or cashews
 Legumes, such as peanuts or baked soybeans.
 Dried fruits such as raisins, cranberries, apricots, apples, banana chips, sultanas or candied orange peel 
 Chocolate: chocolate chips, chunks, and M&M's
 Breakfast cereals such as granola
 Rye chips
 Pretzels
 Seeds, such as pumpkin seeds or sunflower seeds
 Carob chips
 Shredded coconut
 Ginger (crystallized)

Popular mixes 
There are common trail mix varieties, which are commonly made at home, or can commonly be found pre-mixed in supermarkets by numerous producers.
 Cape Cod trail mix (sometimes called Northeastern): almonds, cashews, and dried cranberries.
 Hawaiian trail mix (aka Tropical): pineapple, mango, banana chips, coconut, and cashews.
 Mexican trail mix (aka Sweet and Spicy): mango, sunflower seeds, pepitas, raisins, and chili powder.
 Monster trail mix (aka Peanut Butter and Chocolate): peanut butter chips, peanuts, M&M's, and sometimes either or both raisins and cranberries.
 Omega-3 trail mix: cashews, walnuts, raisins, cinnamon apples pieces.
 Santa Fe trail mix (aka Southwestern or Hatch): toasted corn, peanuts, pumpkin seeds, pistachios, and New Mexico chile powder.
 Asia mix (sometimes called Zen): peanuts, sesame sticks, rice crackers, and soybeans.

See also

 Snack mix
 Snacking

References

Snack foods